Mystic Puzzle was a South Korean project group consisting of Mr. Sync and Asher. They debuted with the album Mystic Puzzle Land  on January 16, 2008.

Discography

Studio albums

References

Musical groups established in 2000
South Korean hip hop groups
South Korean electronic music groups